Jianchangornis a genus of basal ornithuromorph birds. Fossils were recovered from the Jiufotang Formation at Liaoning, China.

Description 
A specimen IVPP-V16708 includes skull, partial skeleton and feathers.

References

Prehistoric animals of China
Prehistoric euornitheans
Bird genera
Early Cretaceous birds of Asia
Fossil taxa described in 2009